Elmaleh is a surname. Notable people with the surname include:

Gad Elmaleh (born 1971), Moroccan standup comedian and actor
Lisa Elmaleh (born 1984), American photographer
Maxime Elmaleh (born 1969), Canadian curler
Sarah Elmaleh, American voice actor
Victor Elmaleh (1918–2014), Moroccan-American businessman and real estate developer

Maghrebi Jewish surnames
Surnames of Moroccan origin
Arabic-language surnames